The  is a Japanese suspension bridge, part of the 59 kilometer Nishiseto Expressway connecting the islands of Honshū and Shikoku. Completed in 1988, it has a main span of 560 meters and connects Hakatajima with Ōshima. The expressway connects seven small islands and also includes several other long span bridges including the Tatara Bridge, the Innoshima Bridge, and the Kurushima-Kaikyō Bridge.

External links
 The bridge's page at the Honshū-Shikoku Bridge Expressway Company
 

Suspension bridges in Japan
Bridges completed in 1988
Buildings and structures in Ehime Prefecture
Roads in Ehime Prefecture